Puthiyakavu Devi Temple is a temple in Ponkunnam, Kerala, India. It is a resting place for Sabarimala pilgrims.

Hindu temples in Kottayam district
Devi temples in Kerala